Roydon 'Roy' Cutts (born 1953) is an English international lawn and indoor bowler.

Bowls career
Cutts made his international debut in 1979 and represented England during the 1990 Commonwealth Games in Auckland, New Zealand and represented England at the 1994 Commonwealth Games in Victoria, British Columbia, Canada.

He has won a national title bowling for Marlborough BC and Suffolk.

References

1953 births
Living people
English male bowls players
Bowls players at the 1990 Commonwealth Games
Bowls players at the 1994 Commonwealth Games
Commonwealth Games competitors for England